Kathanayaki ) is a 1955 Indian Tamil language romantic comedy film directed by K. Ramnoth and produced by T. R. Sundaram. The film stars Padmini, T. R. Ramachandran, M. N. Rajam and K. A. Thangavelu. It was released on 19 February 1955. The film's story takes inspiration from the 1951 film Happy Go Lovely.

Plot 

The story set in a drama troupe company. Padmini leaves home and joins drama company whose owner T. R. Ramachandran falls in love with her. She faces many problems and how she and her boyfriend solve them forms the rest of the plot.

Cast 

Padmini
T. R. Ramachandran
M. N. Rajam
K. A. Thangavelu
K. Malathi
T. K. Ramachandran
K. S. Angamuthu
A. Karunanidhi
P. S. Gnanam
P. D. Sambandam
K. R. Jayagowri
K. K. Soundar
M. R. Santhanam
V. P. S. Mani
T. K. Kalyanam
Jayasakthivel
S. Ramarao
M. R. Sundaram
R. M. Sethupathi
Rajasekharan
Raju
Nagaratnam

Soundtrack 
Music was scored by G. Ramanathan while the lyrics were penned by Suratha, Kannadasan and Thanjai N. Ramaiah Dass.

Release and reception 
Kathanayaki was released on 19 February 1955. According to historian Randor Guy, the film was not successful as some critics felt it had a "predictable" storyline.

References

External links 
 

1950s Tamil-language films
1955 films
1955 romantic comedy films
Films about actors
Films directed by K. Ramnoth
Films scored by G. Ramanathan
Indian romantic comedy films